Espinho may refer to:

Places
 Espinho, Portugal, a city and municipality of Portugal
 Espinho (Braga), a civil parish in the municipality of Braga, Portugal
 Espinho (Mangualde), a civil parish in the municipality of Mangualde, Portugal
 , a civil parish in the municipality of Mortágua, Portugal
 Espinho Branco, village in island Santiago, Cape Verde

Other uses 
 S.C. Espinho, a Portuguese sports club from the city of Espinho in the Aveiro district
 Espinho Airport, an airport serving Espinho in northern Portugal